Noël Chiboust (October 4, 1909, Thorigny-sur-Marne - January 17, 1994, Pau) was a French jazz trumpeter and reedist.

Chiboust started out as a violinist, playing in Ray Ventura's orchestra from 1928 to 1931, but settled on trumpet soon after. He did a stint in the French army, then played trumpet in the mid-1930s with Freddy Johnson, Michel Warlop, Coleman Hawkins, and Guy Paquinet. By 1937, he had switched instruments again, this time to tenor saxophone; on this instrument, he worked with Bill Coleman, Joe Keyes, Serge Glykson, Raymond Wraskoff, and Fred Adison. He founded his own ensemble in 1941, which he led until 1969; he continued playing locally with his own big band even after retiring from active touring.

References
Michel Laplace, "Noël Chiboust". The New Grove Dictionary of Jazz. 2nd edition, ed. Barry Kernfeld.

French jazz trumpeters
Male trumpeters
French jazz saxophonists
Male saxophonists
French jazz violinists
French jazz clarinetists
French jazz bandleaders
1909 births
1994 deaths
20th-century saxophonists
20th-century trumpeters
20th-century French male violinists
20th-century French male musicians
French male jazz musicians